The Public Procurement Regulatory Authority is an autonomous body endowed with the responsibility of prescribing regulations and procedures for public procurements by Federal Government owned public sector organizations with a view to improve  governance, management, transparency, accountability and quality of public procurement of goods, works and services. It is also endowed with the responsibility of monitoring procurement by public sector agencies/organizations and has been delegated necessary powers under the Public Procurement Regulatory Authority Ordinance 2002.

The Public Procurement Regulatory Authority (PPRA) is a regulatory authority in Pakistan responsible for prescribing regulations and procedures for public procurement by Government of Pakistan-owned public sector organizations and monitoring of procurement undertaken by other public sector organizations under the Public Procurement Regulatory Authority Ordinance of May 2002. The PPRA Board consists of six ministerial appointments from central government departments, three private members and the Authority's managing director.

Amendments have been made in the Rules  vide S.R.O. No. 442(I)/2020 dated 15th May, 2020 and vide S.R.O. No. 834(I)/2021 dated 28th June, 2021.

All the Tenders i.e. Invitation to Bids are published on its official website. Procurement Plans of Procuring Agencies are also available on website. Standard Bidding Documents are also available on the website i.e. Public Procurement Regulatory Authority (www.ppra.org.pk).

In 2019 the authority was accused of making 32 appointments in a non-transparent manner, and the office of the Auditor General of Pakistan raised objections to the appointments.

References

Government agencies established in 2002
Regulatory authorities of Pakistan